In linear elasticity, the equations describing the deformation of an elastic body subject only to surface forces (or body forces that could be expressed as potentials) on the boundary are (using index notation) the equilibrium equation:

where  is the stress tensor, and the Beltrami-Michell compatibility equations:

A general solution of these equations may be expressed in terms of the Beltrami stress tensor. Stress functions are derived as special cases of this Beltrami stress tensor which, although less general, sometimes will yield a more tractable method of solution for the elastic equations.

Beltrami stress functions 

It can be shown  that a complete solution to the equilibrium equations may be written as

Using index notation:

{| class="collapsible collapsed" width="30%" style="text-align:left"
!Engineering notation
|-
|
|               
|
|-
|
|               
|
|-
|
|               
|
|}

where  is an arbitrary second-rank tensor field that is at least twice differentiable, and is known as the Beltrami stress tensor. Its components are known as Beltrami stress functions.  is the Levi-Civita pseudotensor, with all values equal to zero except those in which the indices are not repeated. For a set of non-repeating indices the component value will be +1 for even permutations of the indices, and -1 for odd permutations. And  is the Nabla operator. For the Beltrami stress tensor to satisfy the Beltrami-Michell compatibility equations in addition to the equilibrium equations, it is further required that  is at least four times continuously differentiable.

 Maxwell stress functions 

The Maxwell stress functions are defined by assuming that the Beltrami stress tensor  is restricted to be of the form.

The stress tensor which automatically obeys the equilibrium equation may now be written as:

{| 
|-
|
|               
|
|-
|
|               
|
|-
|
|               
|
|}

The solution to the elastostatic problem now consists of finding the three stress functions which give a stress tensor which obeys the Beltrami–Michell compatibility equations for stress. Substituting the expressions for the stress into the Beltrami–Michell equations yields the expression of the elastostatic problem in terms of the stress functions:

These must also yield a stress tensor which obeys the specified boundary conditions.

 Airy stress function 

The Airy stress function is a special case of the Maxwell stress functions, in which it is assumed that A=B=0 and C is a function of x and y only. This stress function can therefore be used only for two-dimensional problems.

In polar coordinates the expressions are:

 Morera stress functions 

The Morera stress functions are defined by assuming that the Beltrami stress tensor  tensor is restricted to be of the form 

The solution to the elastostatic problem now consists of finding the three stress functions which give a stress tensor which obeys the Beltrami-Michell compatibility equations. Substituting the expressions for the stress into the Beltrami-Michell equations yields the expression of the elastostatic problem in terms of the stress functions:

{| 
|-
|
|               
|
|-
|
|               
|
|-
|
|               
|
|}

 Prandtl stress function 

The Prandtl stress function''' is a special case of the Morera stress functions, in which it is assumed that A=B=0 and C is a function of x and y only.

Notes

References

See also
 Elasticity (physics)
 Elastic modulus
 Infinitesimal strain theory
 Linear elasticity
 Solid mechanics
 Stress (mechanics)

Elasticity (physics)
Solid mechanics
Structural analysis